Chilubi District with headquarters at Chilubi is located in Northern Province, Zambia. It covers the north-east Lake Bangweulu and Bangweulu Wetlands containing several islands including Chilubi Island, and some of the mainland northeast of the lake. As of the 2000 Zambian Census, the district had a population of 66,338 people.

Like Samfya District most of it is lake or swamp, and the rest rural and less developed than Samfya, lacking roads and infrastructure. The only road connections for its mainland part is a dirt road from Luwingu in the north to Mofu and Chaba. Swamps of the Lukulu, Lubansenshi, and Chambeshi rivers cut the district off on its eastern side.  Channels have been cut through the swamps in many places to aid navigation by boat. Since they share the lake and swamps, geographically Chilubi District has more in common with Samfya District in Luapula Province than it does with the rest of Northern Province. Most travellers leaving the district go by boat to Nsombo then by gravel road to Kasama via Luwingu, or by boat to Samfya then by all-weather road to Mansa or Serenje.

Other islands in Chilubi District include Chichile, Kasansa, Panyo Island and Luangwa, all at the edges of the swamps where they dry out sufficiently in the dry season to form a connection to the mainland.

Isangano National Park lies in the east of the district but it has no management and most of the wildlife has been poached out.

References

Districts of Northern Province, Zambia